Sharithang is a town in Haa District in southwestern Bhutan.

References

External links
Satellite map at Maplandia.com

Populated places in Bhutan